Kwon Min-sol (Hangul: 권민솔; born 18 February 2009) is a South Korean figure skater. She is the 2022 JGP Czech Republic silver medallist, the 2022 JGP Poland II bronze medallist and the 2022 South Korean junior champion. She placed fifth at the 2023 World Junior Championships.

Career

Early years 
Kwon began skating in 2015. She won the national junior gold medal at the 2022 South Korean Championships.

2022–23 season: International junior debut 
Making her international debut on the Junior Grand Prix at the 2022 JGP Czech Republic in Ostrava, Kwon skated a clean short program. In the free skate, her only error was an unclear edge call on the Lutz in her triple jump combination. She won the silver medal behind Japan's Mao Shimada. Kwon went on to win the bronze medal at her second event, the 2022 JGP Poland II, and qualify for the 2022–23 Junior Grand Prix Final. She finished fifth at the Final.

Kwon finished fifth in her first appearance at the senior South Korean Championships. As a result she was assigned to the 2023 World Junior Championships, placing sixth in the short program
 She set a new personal best score of 128.24 in the free skate, finishing fifth in that segment and rising to fifth place overall. Commenting on the positive reception of her Cats program all season, she added that "I love my program, because I love animals, especially cats. Unfortunately, I don't have my own cat."

Programs

Competitive highlights 
GP: Grand Prix; CS: Challenger Series; JGP: Junior Grand Prix

Detailed results

Junior results

References

External links 
 

2009 births
South Korean female single skaters
Living people
Figure skaters from Seoul